The Covelo AVA is an American Viticultural Area located in northern Mendocino County, California. Although the region only has  under vine, it was granted AVA status by the United States Department of the Treasury Alcohol and Tobacco Tax and Trade Bureau on February 16, 2006, based purely on the unique climate conditions of the area. The area is relatively flat terrain built upon deep loam layers of soil. Unlike other areas in the California wine country, Covelo has a continental climate with the high peaks surrounding the valley shielding it from the influence of the Pacific Ocean. The growing season here is one of the shortest in Mendocino County and the area experiences one of the widest diurnal temperature variation in the region.

See also
Mendocino County wine

References

External links
 Covelo: Mendocino County Wines

American Viticultural Areas
American Viticultural Areas of California
American Viticultural Areas of Mendocino County, California
2006 establishments in California